The Central Committee of the 18th Congress of the All-Union Communist Party (Bolsheviks) was in session from 1939 until 1952, and was replenished in 1941. It elected, at its 1st Plenary Session, the Politburo, the Secretariat, the Orgburo and the Party Control Commission.

Plenums
The CC was not a permanent institution. The CC was convened for 10 plenary sessions between the 18th Congress and the 19th Congress. When the CC was not in session, decision-making powers were transferred to inner bodies of the CC itself; the Politburo, Secretariat and Orgburo (none of these bodies were permanent either, but convened to decide on crucial matters).

Composition

Members

Candidates

References

Citations

Bibliography

Central Committee of the Communist Party of the Soviet Union
1939 establishments in the Soviet Union
1941 disestablishments in the Soviet Union